Walter John "Duke" Nelson (April 26, 1907 – October 22, 1989) was an American college athletics coach and administrator.  He served as the head football coach at Rensselaer Polytechnic Institute (RPI) from 1939 to 1941 and at Middlebury College from 1946 to 1968 compiling  a career college football coaching record of 98–81–12.  At Middlebury, he teams won back-to-back Vermont State Conference championships in 1948 and 1949.  Nelson graduated from Middlebury in 1932.

Head coaching record

Football

References

External links
 

1907 births
1989 deaths
Middlebury Panthers athletic directors
Middlebury Panthers baseball coaches
Middlebury Panthers baseball players
Middlebury Panthers football coaches
Middlebury Panthers football players
Middlebury Panthers men's ice hockey coaches
Middlebury Panthers men's ice hockey players
Middlebury Panthers women's ice hockey coaches
Middlebury Panthers men's lacrosse coaches
RPI Engineers football coaches
Union Dutchmen baseball coaches
Union Dutchmen football coaches
Union Dutchmen ice hockey coaches
College golf coaches in the United States
Sportspeople from Boston